The Enormous Crocodile is the title character in a British 1978 children's story, written by Roald Dahl and illustrated by Quentin Blake, audio narrated alternately on the audio cassette and compact disc releases by Roger Blake and Stephen Fry. The story was adapted into a 1997 TV special.

Synopsis

The story begins in Africa in a big, deep, muddy river, where the big crocodile (the title character) is telling a slightly smaller crocodile, called the "not-so-big one", that he wants to leave his dirty home and eat some real children for his lunch. The small crocodile objects, because real children taste "tough and chewy and nasty and bitter" in his opinion compared to real fish, and because of what happened the very last time the big crocodile ever tried to eat real children. The bigger crocodile leaves the big, deep, muddy river anyway, and announces his intention to first Humpy-Rumpy the hippopotamus on the river bank, then Trunky the elephant in the jungle, then Muggle Wump the monkey, and finally the Roly-Poly Bird in an orange tree. The four jungle animals are all feeling horrified and disgusted with the big crocodile, thereby insulting him on the spot, hoping that he will fail miserably and will himself be killed permanently, after which the reptile himself briefly and unsuccessfully attacks first Muggle-Wump the Monkey in his tree (filled with nuts) and Roly Poly Bird himself in his (newly-built) nest.

First of all, the big crocodile walks over to a quiet forest, not far away from an empty African town, where he disguises himself as a small coconut tree using several fallen tree branches as well as coconuts, hoping to eat Toto and Mary, a brother and a sister from the town itself, but is annoyingly caught by Humpy-Rumpy the Hippopotamus from the muddy river bank, who catches the crocodile with his giant head and sends him "tumbling and skidding over the ground".

Later on, the big crocodile walks to a children's playground located outside an old school. Using only an abandoned tree branch, the crocodile disguises himself as a "see-saw", hoping to eat an entire class of children who want to ride on what they think is the "new see-saw" itself, but, despite the school children's teacher telling the children themselves that it is "a rather knobbly sort of a see-saw", he is disturbed on the spot by Muggle-Wump the Monkey, who tells the whole class of children to "run, run, run" and that the big crocodile is not really a see-saw and that he just wants to eat them up.

Fearing that he might get caught and then killed, the big crocodile walks to a busy funfair where he sees a "big roundabout", operated by a human man who he doesn't at all know. When nobody is nearby, the crocodile himself quickly puts himself between a brown lion and a yellow dragon (with a red tongue sticking out of its mouth) hoping to eat a young girl called Jill who wants to ride on him, but is confronted by Roly-Poly Bird from the jungle.

Refusing to give up on his task, the big crocodile finally goes to "the picnic place" located in a tropical woodland just outside the town which has trees and bushes all around it. When nobody is looking, however, the crocodile picks a bunch of beautiful flowers with his front legs, and then he arranges it on top of one of the tables in the area. From exactly the same table, the crocodile sneakily takes away one of the place's long benches and hides the long bench itself in one of the clumps of bushes in the area before disguising himself as a wooden four-legged bench using all four of his legs, hoping to eat four children, ("two boys and two girls") who are all going out on a picnic together, but is annoyingly discovered by Trunky the Elephant.

With a chance to save the day, Trunky the Elephant marches through the jungle to the Picnic Place. Once Trunky is standing beside the table with the flowers on top of it, he crossly picks the big crocodile himself up by his tail before telling him that he, Roly-Poly Bird, Humpy-Rumpy and Muggle-Wump have "all had quite enough of (his) clever tricks". Then Trunky swings the big crocodile around in the air by his tail, slowly at first, then a bit faster, then a lot faster, and finally very fast, before eventually throwing him into the sky with his trunk. The dizzy enormous crocodile flies diagonally through Earth's stratosphere, and through the Universe. The crocodile zooms past the Moon, past all the other planets, and then past the many twinkling stars. The story ends as, "with the most tremendous BANG!" the flying Enormous Crocodile crashes headfirst into the "hot hot Sun" in the middle of the Solar System, where he becomes "sizzled up like a sausage", killing him once and for all.

Style and publication date 
The Enormous Crocodile is in the style of a picture book in contrast to Roald Dahl's other story books, illustrated by Quentin Blake. It was published on 1 November 1978.

Connections to other Roald Dahl Stories
 Muggle-Wump the monkey also appears in The Twits in which he is accompanied by a whole family of Muggle-Wumps. A monkey which looks like Blake's illustration of exactly the same character also appears in The Giraffe and the Pelly and Me.
 The Roly-Poly Bird makes a surprising appearance in The Twits and he can also be seen in Dirty Beasts.
 A recipe outlining how to make your own edible Enormous Crocodile appears in Roald Dahl's Revolting Recipes.

References

1978 children's books
Animal tales
British picture books
Children's books by Roald Dahl
Children's short stories
Fiction set in the 1970s
Fictional crocodilians
Jonathan Cape books